Stadio Euganeo is a football stadium in Padua, Italy. It is also used for athletics, concerts, rugby league and rugby union. It replaced the old and historical Appiani stadium.

From 1994 to the present, it is the home of Calcio Padova. It has a total capacity of 32,420.

Due to strict Italian laws about security in football matches, for football only the stadium capacity can be reduced to 18,060 places.

It also played temporary host to Treviso for their first few matches in Serie A in the 2005–06 season, as their ground, Stadio Omobono Tenni, was deemed unfit; and to Cittadella, when playing her first two Serie B championships in the 2000–01 and 2001–02 seasons.

By 2010–2011 season it has been used also for the home matches of the second football team of the city, San Paolo Padova, playing in Serie D.

Euganeo hosted the international rugby match Italy-Australia (20–30) on 8 November 2008, with an attendance of about 30,000 people, likely being the most attended rugby match in Italy.

On 22 November 2014, it hosted Italy's end-of-year rugby union international against South Africa who won 22–6.

The original Stadio Euganeo had previously hosted a rugby league international between Italy and Australia on 23 January 1960. Played as part of the 1959-60 Kangaroo tour of Great Britain and France, the Kangaroos defeated the home side 37–15 in front of a modest crowd of 3,500 curious fans.

Concerts

References

Venue
Euganeo
Euganeo
Rugby league stadiums in Italy
Rugby union stadiums in Italy
Buildings and structures in Padua
Sports venues in Veneto